The Flood Control Act of 1938 was an Act of the United States Congress signed into law by President Franklin Delano Roosevelt that authorized civil engineering projects such as dams, levees, dikes, and other flood control measures through the United States Army Corps of Engineers and other Federal agencies.  It is one of a number of Flood Control Acts passed nearly annually by the United States Congress.

Projects covered by the Act (partial list)

Dams
Green River Lake Dam, Kentucky (begun April 1964, completed June 1969)
Bull Shoals Dam (begun June 1947; completed July 1951)
 Coralville, Iowa, dam forming Coralville Lake (begun 1949; completed 1958)
Delaware (Ohio) Dam (begun 1947; completed 1951)
Kinzua Dam (begun 1960; completed 1965)
Wappapello Dam and Lake Wappapello on the St. Francis River.  Wappapello Dam was dedicated in June, 1941;Langdon R. Jones of Kennett, Missouri, delivered the dedication address at the request of Missouri Governor Lloyd C. Stark.
Shenango River Dam (begun 1963; completed 1965)
Denison Dam
Raccoon Creek dam in Parke County, Indiana, forming Mansfield Lake (begun October 1956; completed July 1960). Mansfield Lake was renamed Cecil M. Harden Lake in 1974.
Dale Hollow Lake Dam, Tennessee (begun 1938, completed 1943)

See also
Water Resources Development Act
Rivers and Harbors Act
for related legislation which sometime also implement flood control provisions.

Notes

1938 in the environment
1938 in law
1938